Stauropus dentilinea, the lobster moth, is a moth of the family Notodontidae. It is found in India and Sri Lanka.

References

External links
The Larva of the Lobster Moth (Stauropus dentilinea Hampson)

Moths of Asia
Notodontidae